The Royal Villa of Durrës, commonly known as Zog's Villa of Durrës, is a historical building in the city of Durrës, Albania. It served as the summer residence of King Zog.

It was used as the summer palace by the Albanian Royal family during the reign of the Monarchy and still remains a symbol of the Monarchy in the City.

It was restored to Leka Crown Prince of Albania in 2007. The restoration process was accepted and approved by the Albanian lands commission, following all the legal procedures without contest. The Palace was a gift given by the Durrës business community as a sign of prosperity to King Zog. Although in 2012.

The villa is set on the Durrës hill, 98 m above the sea level. The sea can be seen from three sides of the villa. It is extended in the form of an eagle and was built in 1926. Kristo Sotiri, an architect who had graduated from the University of Padova and the University of Venice, Italy, designed the villa. By the time that Sotiri was designing the building, he had vast experience that included that of being the architect of the Court of Queen Elisabeth of Wied of Romania. The building was finished in 1937, a few months before King Zog married Queen Géraldine Apponyi de Nagyappony.

The villa was used after World War II as a government reception building. During Communist Albania, many communist leaders from Soviet first secretary Nikita Khrushchev to the Cambodian prince Samde Norodom Sihanuk have been guests in the building. Former US President Jimmy Carter also has been one of its guests in the '90s. The interior of the villa was vandalized during the 1997 unrest in Albania. Prince Leka has outlined a reconstruction plan to be implemented in the near future.

Gallery

References

Royal residences in Albania
Buildings and structures in Durrës
Buildings and structures completed in 1926
Villas in Albania